Traiskirchen Lions is a professional basketball club based in Traiskirchen, Austria. The team plays in the Austrian Basketball Superliga. It was founded in 1966 and have won the Austrian championships 3 times.

Trophies
Austrian Championship (3):
1991, 1994, 2000
Austrian Cups (3):
1997, 2000, 2001

Logos

Current roster

Notable players

 Benedikt Danek
 Jakob Pöltl
 Nemanja Bjelica
 Đorđe Drenovac

References

External links
Official website 
Eurobasket.com Traiskirchen Lions Page

Basketball teams established in 1966
Basketball teams in Austria
Baden District, Austria